Katja Dieckow (born 9 September 1984) is a German diver. She competed in the 3 m springboard at the 2008 Summer Olympics and the 3 m springboard at the 2012 Summer Olympics. Dieckow has won a total of two silver and five bronze medals at the European Championships.

References 

1984 births
Living people
Sportspeople from Halle (Saale)
People from Bezirk Halle
German female divers
Olympic divers of Germany
Divers at the 2008 Summer Olympics
Divers at the 2012 Summer Olympics
20th-century German women